Kandle may refer to:
 Kandle, Estonia, a village
 Kandle (musician) (b. 1990), Canadian singer and songwriter
 Victor L. Kandle (1921–1944), American army officer

See also 
 Kandel (disambiguation)
 Candle (disambiguation)